Rake Hall is in Rake Lane, Little Stanney, Cheshire, England. It originated as a country house, the home of the Bunbury family (may have been spelled Bunburries), and was later converted into a public house and restaurant. The house was built in the 17th century, and later altered and expanded.  The building is constructed in pebbledashed brick with stone dressings on a rendered plinth and slate roofs.  It is mainly in two storeys.  Most of the windows are casements, with a dormer at the front, and an oriel window in a canted bay at the rear.  Rake Hall is recorded in the National Heritage List for England as a designated Grade II listed building.

References

Letters from Charles Bunbury Feb 14, 1932 Nauton Hall, Randlesham, Soffolk.
Omerod's History of Cheshire, published 1819.
Memoirs and Literary Remains of Sir Henry Edward Bunbury.

Country houses in Cheshire
Grade II listed buildings in Cheshire
Grade II listed houses
Pubs in Cheshire